Aris Galanopoulos (born 29 September 1981) is a Greek former professional footballer who played as a defender.

Career

Club career
Galanopoulos began his playing career by signing with Kalamata F.C. in August 1999. He later played for Panionios F.C. and Apollon Kalamarias F.C. in the Greek Super League.

Galanopoulos began his career in Kalamata, which debuted in the Superleague Greece at the age of eighteen. It was called for Greece U21 at December 2002 being key member, although his club was relegated to Football League in 2001. In January 2005 he signed with Panionios in which he played just one year. In January 2006 he joined Apollon Kalamarias, where he played until the end of the 2007–08 season . Then he signed to Panserraikos, up to the 2009–10 season. Then he played for two consecutive years at OFI Crete and in 2012 went to Cyprus to Enosis Neon Paralimni.

International career
In December 2002 Galanopoulos called for Greece U21 and was a key member for the team.
Galanopoulos competed for Greece at the 2004 Summer Olympics.

References

External links
Scoresway Profile
Myplayer Profile

1981 births
Living people
Greek footballers
Greece under-21 international footballers
Footballers from Kalamata
Olympic footballers of Greece
Footballers at the 2004 Summer Olympics
Kalamata F.C. players
Panionios F.C. players
Apollon Pontou FC players
Panserraikos F.C. players
OFI Crete F.C. players
Enosis Neon Paralimni FC players
Paniliakos F.C. players
Super League Greece players
Cypriot First Division players
Greek expatriate footballers
Expatriate footballers in Cyprus
Greek expatriate sportspeople in Cyprus
Association football defenders